Paul Eric Kinsman (March 5, 1931 – May 11, 2014), was a Canadian physician and politician in the province of Nova Scotia. He served in the Nova Scotia House of Assembly as a MLA for the constituencies of West Kings (1963–1967) and Kings South (1984). He was also Mayor of Wolfville, Nova Scotia from 1974 to 1976.

Kinsman was born in Berwick, Nova Scotia. He attended Acadia University (Horton Academy), Nova Scotia Normal College and Dalhousie University and held Doctor of Medicine and Master of Surgery degrees from the latter. He also later obtained a Bachelor of Arts in political science from Acadia University in 1972. After a brief teaching career, he practiced as a family physician first in Aylesford, Nova Scotia, and later in Wolfville until his retirement in 2006. In 2001, he was awarded with an Honorary Life Membership in the College of Family Medicine. He died at the Valley Regional Hospital in Kentville, Nova Scotia on May 11, 2014, at the age of 83.

References

1931 births
2014 deaths
Mayors of places in Nova Scotia
People from Kings County, Nova Scotia
Progressive Conservative Association of Nova Scotia MLAs